Cambodia competed at the 2020 Summer Paralympics in Tokyo, Japan.

Disability classifications 

Every participant at the Paralympics has their disability grouped into one of five disability categories; amputation, the condition may be congenital or sustained through injury or illness; cerebral palsy; wheelchair athletes, there is often overlap between this and other categories; visual impairment, including blindness; Les autres, any physical disability that does not fall strictly under one of the other categories, for example dwarfism or multiple sclerosis. Each Paralympic sport then has its own classifications, dependent upon the specific physical demands of competition. Events are given a code, made of numbers and letters, describing the type of event and classification of the athletes competing. Some sports, such as athletics, divide athletes by both the category and severity of their disabilities, other sports, for example swimming, group competitors from different categories together, the only separation being based on the severity of the disability.

Delegation 
Cambodia's flag bearer is Vun Van

Athletics 
Track events

See also 
Cambodia at the 2020 Summer Olympics

References 

Nations at the 2020 Summer Paralympics
Paralympics
2020
2020 in Cambodia